This is a list of castles in Mexico.

Chapultepec Castle, Mexico City
Castillo Douglas, Aguascalientes
Hotel Castillo Santa Cecilia, Guanajuato
Palace of Cortés, Cuernavaca
San Juan de Ulúa, Veracruz

See also
List of castles
Palace of Iturbide, another Imperial residence in Mexico.

 
Castles
Mexico
Castles
Mexico